John Joseph Cullen  (July 9, 1854 – February 11, 1921) was a 19th-century professional baseball player who officially played one year of Major League Baseball in  for the Wilmington Quicksteps of the Union Association

References

External links

1854 births
1921 deaths
19th-century baseball players
Baseball players from Louisiana
Major League Baseball outfielders
Wilmington Quicksteps players
San Francisco Athletics players
San Francisco Mutuals players
San Francisco Bay City players
San Francisco Californias players
Reading Actives players
Wilmington Quicksteps (minor league) players
Nashville Americans players
Chattanooga Lookouts players
Shamokin Maroons players